The Fraternal Greens is a political party in Mauritius. 
At the legislative elections of 3 July 2005, the party was part of the Alliance Sociale, that won 42 out of 70 seats.

References

Green parties in Africa
Political parties in Mauritius
Political parties established in 2002
2002 establishments in Mauritius